The Firesteel River is a river in Thunder Bay District, northwestern Ontario, Canada in the Hudson Bay drainage basin.

Tributaries
Trewartha Creek (right)
Beaver River (right)
Hay River (left)
East Firesteel River (left)
North Firesteel River (right)

See also
List of rivers of Ontario

Sources

Rivers of Thunder Bay District
Tributaries of Hudson Bay